Tim Vigil is an American comic book artist known for horror works, including the series Faust, which Vigil co-created with writer David Quinn. The book's main storyline, Faust: Love of the Damned, was adapted by director Brian Yuzna as the 2001 film of the same name.

Career
Vigil was a member of the Rebel Studios crew.

Bibliography

Grips (at Silverwolf Comics)
Omega ( Omen)
Faust: Love of the Damned (at Rebel Studios)
Caliber Presents at Caliber Comics
Two original covers for Dan DeBono's Independent Comic Guide
Zero Tolerance (at First Comics)
Morella (at Verotik)
Broken Halo (at Broken Halos Studios)
Gunfighters in Hell (with art by his brother Joe Vigil, at Broken Halos Studios) 
Dark Utopia artbook (at Broken Halos Studios)
Gothic Nights artbook (at Broken Halos Studios)
Champions of Hell (at 13 Flames Empire)
Zombie Jesus (at 13 Flames Empire)
777: The Wrath (at Avatar Press)
Faust/777: The Wrath (aka "Darkness in Collision") (at Avatar Press)
Faust: Book of M (at Avatar Press)
Faust: Singha's Talons (at Avatar Press)
Cuda: An Age of Metal and Magic (at Avatar Press)
EO
Webwitch (at Avatar Press)

References

External links
 
 Tim Vigil at the Grand Comics Database
 

20th-century American artists
American comics artists
Living people
Year of birth missing (living people)